Theodore Roosevelt McElroy  (September 15, 1901 – November 12, 1963) was an American telegraph operator and a radio telegrapher FCC amateur with call sign W1JYN. He holds the all-time speed record for receiving Morse code.

Early life 
McElroy was born September 15, 1901 (baptism 1903) in Somerville, Massachusetts. He was named after Theodore Roosevelt, the "cowboy president", whom his parents admired. Roosevelt had succeeded to the presidency upon the death of President William McKinley, the day before McElroy's birth. He went by the name Teddy, Ted, T.R., or Mac as he disliked his birth name. He was the third of six children from a family with an Irish background.

Mid life 
McElroy began his career at Western Union as messenger when he was fourteen years old. He graduated from Forster Grammar School in Somerville, Massachusetts, in 1916. In that same year he enrolled in the Commercial Course at Somerville High School. He became a telegraph operator at the age of fifteen and received his commercial radio operator's license at the age of nineteen.

Family 
McElroy married Margaret Coleman of South Boston on October 26, 1925. Their son John C. McElroy was born on November 11, 1926.

Career 

McElroy went into the manufacturing business when he was 33 years old and eventually formed McElroy Manufacturing Corporation in 1941. He made straight telegraph keys and semi-automatic keys under the trade name of "Mac-Key." He had a couple of dozen variations of his telegraph keys. McElroy also made electronic code practice oscillators and inked tape keyers.

McElroy made telegraph keying equipment for US military personnel during World War II. He manufactured straight telegraph hand keys and semi-automatic keys for the public and the military in the mid 1940s. The Allied Electronics 1940s catalogs showed a variety of his telegraph keys. He amassed a fortune with this equipment that earned him millions of dollars. When his military telegraph equipment was no longer needed after the war he mismanaged his money and spent most of it.

Contests 
McElroy won contests for receiving speed code and setting records when he was 21 years old. He was the first radio receiver to record a speed of more than 50 words per minute. For his accomplishments McElroy was awarded a silver cup that was inscribed "Presented to the Champion Radio Code Operator of the World."

McElroy showed a demonstration of receiving 77 words per minute in 1935. He received a letter by the Cape Cod Radio Club attesting to this fact. The Club initially checked his speed with the 18-dot standard and recorded his speed at 90 words per minute. When the 21-dot standard is applied then his speed is computed to be 77 words per minute (18/21 times 90 wpm = 77 wpm). McElroy showed a speed of 75 words per minute in the Boston "World of Tomorrow" exhibition on 16 November 1938, although it is not counted as an official contest. He demonstrated a copy speed of 75.2 words per minute on 2 July 1939 at the Radio Club in Asheville, North Carolina.

McElroy was named to Philadelphia's Morse Telegraph Hall of Fame in 1964.

Retirement  and death 
McElroy relocated his business to Littleton, Massachusetts around 1950 and in 1955 he sold it to Telegraph Apparatus Company ("T.A.C.") of Chicago. He worked for a few years at T.A.C. and other companies that built electronic equipment, then eventually retired. He gave code demonstrations in retirement and became interested in politics. McElroy died in November 1963.

Legacy 
McElroy donated funds for the radio communication instruments for the expedition of the 1947 Ronne Antarctic Research Expedition. Because of that a mountain peak in Antarctica was named for him, Mount McElroy. It is located inland from the coast just south of latitude −74°.

References

Sources

External links 
 McElroy Telegraph Keys
 Theodore Roosevelt McElroy / World's Champion Radio Telegrapher / The Man, The Legend and The Keys
 Tribute to W1JYN

1901 births
1963 deaths
20th-century American businesspeople
Businesspeople from Massachusetts
History of the telegraph
Morse code
People from Somerville, Massachusetts
People from Boston
Telegraphists